The Glenrae River is a river in the Canterbury region of New Zealand. It arises in the Glynn Wye Range near Mount Skiddaw and flows through the Lake Sumner Forest Park south and then south-east into the Hurunui River, which exits in the Pacific Ocean. Its tributaries include Devils Creek and Robyne Creek.

See also
List of rivers of New Zealand

References

Land Information New Zealand - Search for Place Names

Hurunui District
Rivers of Canterbury, New Zealand
Rivers of New Zealand